José Abreu Morell (1864–1889) was a Cuban painter.  A native of Havana, he studied from 1877 until 1886 at the San Alejandro Academy in that city.  He also traveled to Madrid to study at the Real Academia de Bellas Artes de San Fernando.

References
Brief biography at Cernuda Arte

1864 births
1889 deaths
Artists from Havana
19th-century Cuban painters
19th-century male artists
Male painters